Joseph Chaires Plantation was a large cotton plantation of  located in southern Leon County, Florida, United States owned by Joseph Chaires.

Location
The Joseph Chaires Plantation's northern border was located at the southeast tip of Lake Lafayette. The property extended southward across Old St. Augustine Road. Today that land encompasses part of U.S. 27, Louvinia Drive, County Road 2197 (Williams Road), County Road 2196 (Old St. Augustine Road), County Road 2195 (WW Kelly Drive) as far south as County Road 259 (Tram Road) near Lake Erie and Big Lake.

Plantation specifics
The Leon County Florida 1860 Agricultural Census shows that the Joseph Chaires Plantation had the following:
 Improved Land: 
 Unimproved Land: 
 Cash value of plantation: $50,000
 Cash value of farm implements/machinery: $150
 Cash value of farm animals: $6,500
 Number of persons enslaved: 130
 Bushels of corn: 5000
 Bales of cotton: 200

The owner

Joseph Chaires was the son of Benjamin Chaires and cousin of Green Chaires.

References
Rootsweb Plantations
Largest Slaveholders from 1860 Slave Census Schedules
1845 voters
Paisley, Clifton; From Cotton To Quail, University of Florida Press, c1968.

Plantations in Leon County, Florida
Cotton plantations in Florida